Filomeno Coronado Ortega (born October 7, 1939) is a retired American professional baseball pitcher who appeared in 204 games in Major League Baseball for the Los Angeles Dodgers, Washington Senators and California Angels over all or parts of ten seasons (1960–1969).

Career
Ortega was born in Gilbert, Arizona and graduated from Mesa High School in 1959. Signed by the Dodgers in 1959 to a $75,000 bonus, the 18-year-old Ortega was immediately assigned to Triple-A Spokane, where he got into 22 games, 16 as a starting pitcher. He spent part of 1960 with Spokane, the bulk of the year with Class B Green Bay, and was called to the Dodgers in September for his first taste of MLB action.

In  he logged a full season in the majors, working in 34 games for Los Angeles and making 25 starts. He won seven of 16 decisions but showed promise with four complete games and three shutouts, including a three-hitter against the contending Cincinnati Reds on August 23. But the Dodgers slumped to the second division and, in search of pitching help, included Ortega in a blockbuster December 4, 1964, seven-player trade with the Washington Senators which saw Los Angeles obtain veteran left-hander Claude Osteen for slugger Frank Howard.

Managed by former Dodger teammate Gil Hodges, Ortega took a regular turn in the Senators' rotation, with 94 starting appearances over his first three seasons, including the 1965 "Presidential Opener". The Angels used him in five games in relief during the campaign's early weeks, then sent him to the minors, where he pitched for the rest of his pro career, retiring in 1972.

During his ten-year MLB career, Ortega compiled 46 wins (against 62 defeats), 20 complete games, nine shutouts, 549 strikeouts, and a 4.43 earned run average. In 951 innings pitched, he permitted 884 hits and 378 bases on balls.

References

External links
 
, or Baseball Almanac

1939 births
Living people
American expatriate baseball players in Mexico
Baseball players from Arizona
Cafeteros de Córdoba players
California Angels players
Green Bay Dodgers players
Hawaii Islanders players
Los Angeles Dodgers players
Major League Baseball pitchers
Mesa High School alumni
Mexican League baseball pitchers
Native American people from Arizona
Native American baseball players
People from Gilbert, Arizona
Spokane Indians players
Sultanes de Monterrey players
Washington Senators (1961–1971) players